The men's light heavyweight (81 kg/178.2 lbs) Low-Kick division at the W.A.K.O. European Championships 2004 in Budva was the fourth heaviest of the male Low-Kick tournaments and involved nine fighters.  Each of the matches was three rounds of two minutes each and were fought under Low-Kick kickboxing rules.

As there were too few fighters for a tournament designed for sixteen, seven of the men had a bye through to the quarter finals.  The gold medal was won by Drazenko Ninic from Bosnia and Herzegovina who defeated Mikhail Chalykn from Russia in the final by split decision.  The bronze medal positions were taken by Teppo Laine from Finland and Hungarian Dénes Racz.

Results
These matches ended in a split decision.

See also
List of WAKO Amateur European Championships
List of WAKO Amateur World Championships
List of male kickboxers

References

External links
 WAKO World Association of Kickboxing Organizations Official Site

W.A.K.O. European Championships 2004 (Budva)